The Man Who Never Was is a 1966 ABC-TV 20th Century Fox Television television series  starring Robert Lansing and Dana Wynter. It has no connection with the better-known earlier 20th Century Fox book and film of the same name, and ran for only one season of 18 episodes between September 7, 1966, and January 4, 1967. It was produced by 20th Century Fox Television, was filmed in Europe with the pilot episode being filmed in Berlin and Munich. John Newland produced and directed most of the episodes. The original television pilot starred Canadian actor Don Harron as Mark Wainwright but a change in sponsor led to the new sponsor requesting Robert Lansing in the role.

Plot 
Lansing initially plays the dual role of Peter Murphy, an American spy, and Mark Wainwright, an influential playboy millionaire who is his exact double. One evening, as the spy is being chased through the streets, he sees Wainwright drunkenly stumbling out of a bar. Stunned at the physical resemblance, Murphy unwittingly allows enemy agents to kill Wainwright, after which he assumes his identity. Although Wainwright's wife, Eva, realises immediately that Murphy is not her husband, she allows him to continue the impersonation, partly because it is financially convenient, and partly because she is moved by his kind treatment of her, in comparison to her abusive husband. Murphy and Eva eventually fall in love. In the final episode, "I Take This Woman", which aired on January 4, 1967, Murphy decides to quit being a secret agent. He proposes marriage to Eva, who accepts, which ended the series, One of the few TV shows to have a definite ending. Two movies were later made by editing episodes together, "The Spy with the Perfect Cover" and "Danger Has Two Faces"; both have the final scene from the last episode, but one version of it was re-filmed with the same dialogue.

Cast
Robert Lansing as Peter Murphy/Mark Wainwright
Dana Wynter as Eva Wainwright
Murray Hamilton as Col. Jack Forbes
Alexander Davion as Roger Barry
Paul Steward as Paul Grant

Episode list

References

External links
 

American Broadcasting Company original programming
Television series by 20th Century Fox Television
Espionage television series
English-language television shows
1966 American television series debuts
1967 American television series endings